L'école pratique des hautes études commerciales (EPHEC) is a university college in Belgium. The school has three campuses, Woluwe-Saint-Lambert, Louvain-la-Neuve and Schaerbeek, with the majority of courses taught in French and a few taught in English.

EPHEC offers the following degrees:

Bachelor in Foreign Trade
Bachelor in Marketing
Bachelor in Accounting and Management
Bachelor of Law
Bachelor in E-Business
Bachelor in Information Technology
Bachelor in Electromechanics

External links 
 Site officiel de l'EPHEC

L'ecole pratique des hautes etudes commerciale
Business schools in Belgium